The Fred Hollows Foundation is a non-profit aid organisation based in Sydney, Australia, which was founded in 1992 by eye surgeon Fred Hollows. The foundation focuses on treating and preventing blindness and other vision problems. It operates in Australia, South East Asia, East Asia, the Middle East, and Africa, and has restored sight for over two and a half million people.

History
In 1976, Fred Hollows and teams of health workers set out on the National Trachoma and Eye Health Program with the aim to eliminate trachoma and other eye conditions on rural and remote communities, and for the first time record the status of eye health in rural Australia. As a result of this program, the number of Indigenous Australians suffering from blindness was halved. Much of the program's success was due to community engagement and involvement in its implementation. Through this program Fred Hollows developed a passion for improving eye health in Australia and internationally.

The Fred Hollows Foundation was founded on 3 September 1992, by Fred Hollows shortly before he died. Hollows was an ophthalmologist, a skilled surgeon and a social justice activist. Hollows was committed to improving the health of Indigenous Australians and to reducing the cost of eye health care and treatment in developing countries. He had already started project work in Eritrea, Nepal, Vietnam and Indigenous Australia. His work in Vietnam was only in the early stages when he died, but he restored the sight of thousands of people in Australia and internationally.  Following Fred's passing, his widow, Gabi Hollows, followed through on the commitment that she had made to her late husband and ensured that his work in Vietnam (and other countries) continued through the foundation.

Goals
The main goal of the foundation is to put an end to avoidable blindness. The foundation believes in integrity, empowerment, collaboration, and action in order to achieve a world in which no person is needlessly blind. In addition, the foundation strives to accomplish the following objectives:

 Ending avoidable blindness in the communities and countries where they work
 Address cataract, diabetic retinopathy, trachoma, refractive error, childhood blindness, and glaucoma 
 Improving the life chances and choices of Indigenous Australians by ameliorating their health
 Maintaining strong partnerships and cross-sector collaborations – at local, national and global levels
 Having the ability to facilitate effective Optometry and health programs, especially the Australian Indigenous, and also to have a positive impact on public opinion, policies and practices to build a strong and secure organisation.
The Foundation invests in training, advocacy, research and technology to eliminate avoidable blindness. By training, doctors, nurses, and health care workers, the foundation strives to empower local people to create sustainable change. Through advocacy efforts, the foundation works with governments, partners and local communities to achieve long term change. With a growing knowledge and understanding of research and technology, the foundation creates effective solutions to restore sight and end avoidable blindness.

Programs

The Fred Hollows Foundation works to put an end to avoidable blindness in over 25 countries. In order to make a difference the Fred Hollows Foundation focuses on building local eye health capacity. By doing so, the foundation trains eye care providers at all levels of the health system including ophthalmologists, doctors, optometrists, orthoptists, nurses, community health volunteers, equipment technicians and other hospital administrators. The foundation also supports the prevention and treatment of eye disease by screening for diseases that cause avoidable blindness, performing surgery, providing spectacles, addressing lifestyle factors that contribute to disease, and conducting other sight saving interventions. The foundation provides innovative technology and resources needed to upgrade and construct eye health clinics. Through these efforts, Fred Hollows promotes eye health at a national and global level.

Overall, The foundation also works to provide a full range of eye health services including eye health promotion, screening, prevention, curative treatment and rehabilitation.

Africa
In Africa – The foundation focuses on comprehensive eye health systems with an emphasis on the training of medical staff, screening for poor vision and eye disease, subsidised treatment and provision of equipment and infrastructure in countries such as Eritrea, Kenya, Rwanda, Ethiopia, and Burundi.

South Asia, East Asia & Middle East
The foundation works throughout South Asia, East Asia and the Middle East in countries such as Afghanistan, Myanmar, Pakistan, Bangladesh, Nepal, Palestine, Cambodia, China, Indonesia, Timor Leste, Philippines, Lao PDR, and Vietnam. In each of these countries the Fred Hollows Foundation strives to build comprehensive eye care systems at village, district, provincial and national levels.

Indigenous Australia
The foundation works with partners to advocate to governments for sustained investments in services to improve eye health and close the health inequality gap between Aboriginal and Torres Strait Australians with the rest of the Australian population.

The foundation's outreach can be seen in the following areas:

 The Fred Hollows Foundation works in many Indigenous communities throughout Australia, including the Jawoyn community of the Northern Territory. In the Jawoyn community, the foundation works on improving eye health, as well as literacy and nutrition throughout the community. The programming and advocacy activities specifically aim to address cataract, diabetic retinopathy, and trachoma.
 Address ophthalmology workforce shortages to increase specialist outreach eye care
 Coordinate and improve existing outreach eye care services by increasing the regional workforce, service coordination, and support to patients
 Build the eye health workforce to ensure there are effective human resources available to help increase the rates of early detection, treatment, and management of eye diseases
 Enhance and strengthen health systems to improve patient accessibility and experience and integrate eye care into the primary health care system
 Raise the profile of eye care as a public health issue on a regional and national level.

In February 2008, the foundation committed up to A$3 million to build an eye clinic in Alice Springs, Australia. By April 2010, this clinic had not been built with criticism that the Australian Government were relying on a charity to build the clinic. The Minister for Indigenous Health, Warren Snowdon, said the foundation was best placed to provide the eye clinic service.

Accreditation
The foundation is a member of the Australian Council for International Development (ACFID), and is also a signatory to the ACFID code of conduct that "defines standards of governance, management, financial control and reporting with which non government development organisations (NGDOs) should comply."

Australia's overseas aid agency, AusAID, has accredited The Fred Hollows Foundation, and as such The foundation is eligible to receive funding from the Australian Government for overseas aid programs. According to AusAID "the accreditation process aims to provide AusAID, and the Australian public, with confidence that the Australian Government is funding professional, well-managed, community-based organisations that are capable of delivering quality development outcomes."

Awards and recognition
The Fred Hollows Foundation has consistently been named one of Australia's Top 5 Reputable Charities. The foundation was named 2013 Australian Charity of the Year and was recognised by The Global Journal as one of the world's top 50 NGOs.
 2005 – Winner of the National Award for Excellence in Community Business Partnerships in recognition of the successful partnership between The foundation, Woolworths and the Wugularr community for the Community Stores Program.
 2009 – Winner of the Gold Star award for non-profit video at the International Fundraising Congress in The Netherlands.
 2013 – Winner of the National Charity Award in the inaugural Australian Charity Awards – a new partner program of The Australian Business Awards
 2013 – Ranked within the top fifty best non-government organisations (NGOs) in the world in an annual list of the top 100 NGOs published by the Global Journal

Ambassadors and supporters
Over the years, The foundation has been supported by a number of high-profile celebrities and athletes, including:
 Tim Macartney-Snape – Mount Everest mountaineer and adventurer
 Nic Cester – musician. Cester's band Jet released a video clip in 2008 paying tribute to Hollows.
 Aaron Davey – AFL Player
 Adam Spencer – TV and Radio Personality
 Jessica McNamee – Actress and TV Personality
 Jimmy Little – Performer
 Julie McCrossin – Radio and TV Personality
 Linley Frame – Olympic Swimmer
 Ray Martin – TV Personality
 Shellie Morris – Singer/Songwriter
 Susie O'Neill – Olympic Gold Medalist
 Joel Edgerton – Actor, Director, and Producer

Controversy
In late 2009, it was claimed that in the previous year the foundation lost more than $2 million with the investment bank Goldman Sachs JBWere. A former member of the organisation's British board, Nick Crane, said the losses were evidence of a new entrepreneurial zeal in the Australian head office, and that the foundation was at risk of losing sight of its true purpose because newer members of the Australian management team had backgrounds in business rather than charity. The foundation denied these claims, and responded that the $2 million loss was incorrect and that The foundation had lost $270,000 from investments but had actually gained $350,000 income. However, the value of the foundation's investments had been written down by $1.6 million by end of 2008. After a letter from Gabi Hollows to the editor of the Sydney Morning Herald, the article was corrected. The Fred Hollows Foundation in New Zealand had also lost no money in their investments in New Zealand.

See also
 Fred Hollows
 Gabi Hollows
 Orbis International
 Sightsavers
 Eyes for Africa

References

External links
  The Fred Hollows Foundation Australia official website
 The Fred Hollows Foundation New Zealand official website
 The Fred Hollows Foundation United Kingdom official website

Medical and health organisations based in New South Wales
Organisations serving Indigenous Australians
Health charities in Australia
Organizations established in 1992
Organisations based in Sydney
Eye care in Australia
1992 establishments in Australia